Ranabima Baseball Club is part of Ranabima Royal College, Kandy. Only Ranabima Royal College student can get the membership of Ranabima Baseball Club. It means Only Old Ranabima Royalists and students of Ranabima Royal College are in the club. And also it is one of the leading baseball clubs in Sri Lanka.

Ranabima Baseball Team Captains

National Baseball Championship 
Ranabima Baseball club have been champions and runner-up for many times:

Sri Lanka Baseball Championship 2014 - Champions
Sri Lanka Baseball Championship 2016 - Runner-up

National baseball team members 
Ranabima Baseball club has produced number of international baseball players. Ranabima baseball players contribution was very effective to win West Asia Baseball cup 2019 to Sri Lanka national baseball team.

List of national baseball team members produced by Ranabima Baseball 

 Vimukthi Senevirathne
 Pasindu Perera
 Theekshna Gammanpila
 Sanan Kulathunga
 Manna Uthum

See also 

 Ranabima Royal College
 Sri Lanka national baseball team

References 

Baseball teams established in 2006